"57" is a song by Biffy Clyro from their 2002 debut album, Blackened Sky.

Information
This song was the third single from Blackened Sky. An early version of it, with different vocals and guitars, appeared on their debut EP, thekidswhopoptodaywillrocktomorrow. Its intro is played in a mixture of 5/4 and 3/4 time, while the rest of the song is played in 4/4. Also when played live it is sped up noticeably.

Track listings
Songs and lyrics by Simon Neil. Music by Biffy Clyro.
CD BBQ358CD
 "57" – 3:22
 "Hope For An Angel (Radio 1 Session)" – 4:06
 "Time As An Imploding Unit/Waiting For Green" – 9:24
7" BBQ358
 "57" – 3:22
 "Kill the Old, Torture Their Young (Evening Session Version)" – 6:10

Personnel
 Simon Neil – guitar, vocals
 James Johnston – bass, vocals
 Ben Johnston – drums, vocals
 Chris Sheldon – producer

References

External links
"57" Lyrics
"57" Guitar Tablature

Biffy Clyro songs
2002 songs
Songs written by Simon Neil
Song recordings produced by Chris Sheldon
Beggars Banquet Records singles
2002 singles